Mesosa lineata is a species of beetle in the family Cerambycidae. It was described by Stephan von Breuning in 1939. It is known from Sumatra, Malaysia and Borneo.

References

lineata
Beetles described in 1939